Events from the 1410s in Denmark.

Incumbents
 Monarch – Eric of Pomerania

Events
1413
 22 January  Skagen is incorporated as a market town.
 7 December  Kerteminde is incorporated as a market town. It is established that the citizens have the same rights as those of Svendborg and Faaborg. Alle harbours between Knudshoved and Fynshoved are prohibited.

1416
 Maribo Abbeythe first Bridgettine abbey in Denmarkis established in the town of Skimminge on a gift of land (Grimstrup) from Queen Margaret I

Births
 26 February 1418– Christopher III, King of Denmark, Norway and Sweden (died 1448)
Unknown date
 c. 1415 – Erik Axelsson Tott, statesman, regent of Sweden (died 1467)

Deaths
 27 August 1410 – Abraham Brodersson, statesman and military commander
 28 October 1412– Margaret I of Denmark, queen of Denmark, Norway and Sweden (born 1353)

 19 October 1416 – Peder Jensen Lodehat, bishop and politician

References

1410s in Denmark